Colin William George Gibson,  (February 16, 1891 – July 3, 1974) was a Canadian politician, land surveyor and lawyer.

Career
He graduated from the Royal Military College of Canada in Kingston, Ontario in 1911 (cadet # 805), where Kenneth Stuart, a future Commander of the Canadian Army, was a fellow cadet. He served with the Royal Fusiliers of the British Army in 1914 and graduated from the University of Toronto in 1915 where he was a Member of Alpha Delta Phi. He was lieutenant-colonel of the Royal Hamilton Light Infantry from 1929 to 1934. He practiced law from 1919. 
He was a founding member of the Royal Military College of Canada ex-cadet club in Hamilton, Ontario in 1930. He became Commandant of Hamilton Garrison from 1935 to 1939.

As Member of Parliament for Hamilton West, he was reelected three times from 1940.03.26 to 1950. He was first elected as the Liberal Member of Parliament for Hamilton West in 1940, with 55.9% of the vote in a two candidate race.  Following his election, he was appointed as Minister of National Revenue (1940.07.08 - 1945.03.07).  Near the end of his first term, he was also appointed as the acting and later permanent Minister of National Defence for Air (1945.03.08 - 1946.12.11).
He served as Secretary of State (1948.11.15 - 1949.03.31) and (1946.12.12 - 1948.11.14). He was Minister for Mines and Resources (1949.04.01 - 1950.01.17).

Following his re-election with 40.2% of the vote (in a three-way, four-party race), he continued as Minister of National Defence for Air (1945.01.11 - 1945.03.07).  He was made the Secretary of State for Canada (1948.11.15 - 1949.03.31) and (1946.12.12 - 1948.11.14).  Just before the end of his second term, he was moved to the post of Minister of Energy, Mines and Resources (Canada) (1949.04.01 - 1950.01.17).

He continued in this post after he was re-elected in 1949 (with 43.5% of the vote).  He resigned from both cabinet and parliament upon his appointment as Puisne judge of the Supreme Court of Ontario.
He died in 1974.

Family
Gibson was the son of Major General Sir John Morison Gibson, former Attorney General of Ontario. His son, Colin D. Gibson, held the riding of Hamilton—Wentworth from 1968 to 1972.

Legacy
The Gibson Medal at the Royal Military College of Canada is awarded to the top graduating student in the Arts Division.

References

Books
4237 Dr. Adrian Preston & Peter Dennis (Edited) "Swords and Covenants" Rowman And Littlefield, London. Croom Helm. 1976.
H16511 Dr. Richard Arthur Preston "To Serve Canada: A History of the Royal Military College of Canada" 1997 Toronto, University of Toronto Press, 1969.
H16511 Dr. Richard Arthur Preston "Canada's RMC - A History of Royal Military College" Second Edition 1982
H16511 Dr. Richard Preston "R.M.C. and Kingston: The effect of imperial and military influences on a Canadian community" 1968
H1877 R. Guy C. Smith (editor) "As You Were! Ex-Cadets Remember". In 2 Volumes. Volume I: 1876-1918. Volume II: 1919-1984. Royal Military College. [Kingston]. The R.M.C. Club of Canada. 1984

1891 births
1974 deaths
Canadian Presbyterians
Judges in Ontario
Lawyers in Ontario
Liberal Party of Canada MPs
Members of the House of Commons of Canada from Ontario
Members of the King's Privy Council for Canada
Politicians from Hamilton, Ontario
Royal Military College of Canada alumni
Royal Fusiliers officers
Canadian military personnel from Ontario
British Army personnel of World War I